The Windsurfing World Championships is an international sailing competition organized by World Sailing held since 1980, now annually.

Men

Mistral Class

RS:X Class

Women

Mistral Class

RS:X Class

See also
Sailing World Championships
List of World Championships medalists in sailing (windsurfer classes)
2006 RS:X World Championships
Sailing at the Summer Olympics

References

External links
World Sailing

 
Recurring sporting events established in 1980